The 2014 Damallsvenskan, part of the 2014 Swedish football season, was the 27th season of Damallsvenskan since its establishment in 1988. The season started on 13 April 2014 and ended on 19 October 2014. LdB Malmö, which was renamed to FC Rosengård in December 2013, were the defending champions and won the title with several match days before the end of the season.

Originally the season featured 12 teams, but due to Tyresö FF's midseason withdrawal, the season ended with 11 teams; nine returned from the 2013 season and the other two were promoted from Elitettan. On 28 September 2014, with few fixtures remaining in the season, relegation was confirmed for Jitex BK after they were defeated by Kristianstads.

Teams 

Mallbackens IF and Sunnanå SK were relegated at the end of the 2013 season after finishing in the bottom two places of the table. They were replaced by Elitettan top-two teams Eskilstuna United DFF and AIK.

 1 According to each club information page at the Swedish Football Association website for Allsvenskan.
 2  Withdrew midseason due to lack of players.

League table

Results

Season statistics
As of 19 October 2014

Top scorers

Top assists

References

External links 
 Official website 

Damallsvenskan seasons
1
Dam
Sweden
Sweden